The Department of Territories and Local Government was an Australian government department that existed between March 1983 and December 1984.

Scope
Information about the department's functions and/or government funding allocation could be found in the Administrative Arrangements Orders, the annual Portfolio Budget Statements and in the Department's annual reports.

According to the Administrative Arrangements Order (AAO) made on 11 March 1983, the Department dealt with the following principal matters:
Administration of the Australian Capital Territory, the Jervis Bay  Territory, the Territory of Cocos (Keeling) Islands, the Territory  of Christmas Island, the Coral Seas Islands Territory and the  Territory of Ashmore and Cartier Islands and of Commonwealth  responsibilities on Norfolk Island. 
Constitutional development of the Northern Territory of Australia. 
Matters relating to local government.

Structure
The Department was an Australian Public Service department, staffed by officials who were responsible to the Minister for Territories and Local Government, Tom Uren.

The Department was divided into six divisions. The Department was headed by a Secretary, initially Tony Blunn (until 3 May 1983) and then J.D. Enfield (from 24 May 1983).

References

Territories and Local Government
Ministries established in 1983
1984 disestablishments in Australia
1983 establishments in Australia